Nanga Sago is a mountain situated 15 km north of Leh, capital of Ladakh in India. Its altitude is 5776m (18950 feet).

Mountains of Ladakh
Geography of Ladakh